The following is the list of complete accolades received by American stand-up comedian, actor, writer, producer, and film director Chris Rock.

Main awards

Golden Globe Awards

Grammy Awards

Primetime Emmy Awards

Miscellaneous awards

American Comedy Awards

AFI Awards

BET Awards

Black Reel Awards

Blockbuster Entertainment Awards

British Comedy Awards

CableACE Awards

Critics' Choice Movie Awards

Critics' Choice Television Awards

Directors Guild of America Awards

Drama League Awards

Environmental Media Awards

Golden Raspberry Awards

Gotham Awards

Hollywood Critics Association TV Awards

Hollywood Film Awards

Hollywood Walk of Fame

MTV Movie Awards

NAACP Image Awards

National Board of Review Awards

Nickelodeon Kids' Choice Awards

Palm Springs International Film Festival

People's Choice Awards

Satellite Awards

St. Louis Gateway Film Critics Association Awards

TCA Awards

Teen Choice Awards

Washington D.C. Area Film Critics Association Awards

Writers Guild of America Awards

Young Artist Awards

References

External links
 

Rock, Chris
Awards